, is a Japanese actress and singer from Tokyo. She is member of the performance group Psalm (SARM).

Filmography

Drama 
 Tomica Hero: Rescue Fire (2009)

Film 
 Spirited Away (2001) as Rin
 Fuse Teppō Musume no Torimonochō (2012)

Anime 
 Xam'd: Lost Memories (2008) as Ishuu Benikawa

Discography

Studio albums 
 2006 - Shen Mont
 2007 - Psalm for the trip
 2008 - Redon implied

Singles
 Unno song
 Hikarinofune
 Psalm of the Sea
 To Uminbo
 Dark sky

References

External links 
  (Japanese)
 
 

1977 births
Living people
Singers from Tokyo
Japanese women pop singers
21st-century Japanese singers
21st-century Japanese women singers
Actresses from Tokyo